Xhevat Kelmendi (born January 1955) is an ethnic Albanian singer from Kosovo. Xhevat Kelmendi is from Peja and is one of the greatest 'serenata' (popular songs).

References

1955 births
Living people
Kosovan singers
Kosovo Albanians
People from Peja